Joel Laikka (9 May 1906 – 11 February 1982) was a Finnish writer. His work was part of the literature event in the art competition at the 1948 Summer Olympics.

References

1906 births
1982 deaths
20th-century Finnish writers
Olympic competitors in art competitions
Writers from Vyborg